
Gmina Podegrodzie is a rural gmina (administrative district) in Nowy Sącz County, Lesser Poland Voivodeship, in southern Poland.

Villages
Gmina Podegrodzie contains the villages and settlements of Brzezna, Chochorowice, Długołęka-Świerkla, Gostwica, Juraszowa, Mokra Wieś, Naszczowice, Olszana, Olszanka, Podegrodzie, Podrzecze, Rogi and Stadła.

Neighbouring gminas
Gmina Podegrodzie is bordered by the city of Nowy Sącz and by the gminas of Chełmiec, Łącko, Limanowa, Łukowica and Stary Sącz.

References
Polish official population figures 2006

Podegrodzie
Nowy Sącz County